Euploea eyndhovii, the striped black crow, is a butterfly in the family Nymphalidae. It was described by Cajetan and Rudolf Felder in 1865. It is found in the Indomalayan realm.

Subspecies
E. e. eyndhovii (Java, Palawan, Engano, Nias, Wai Sano, Flores)
E. e. gardineri (Fruhstorfer, 1898) (southern Myanmar, Thailand, Laos, Cambodia, Vietnam, Langkawi, western Malaysia, Singapore)
E. e. arasa Fruhstorfer, 1910 (Vietnam)

References

External links
Euploea at Markku Savela's Lepidoptera and Some Other Life Forms

Euploea
Butterflies described in 1865
Butterflies of Asia
Taxa named by Baron Cajetan von Felder
Taxa named by Rudolf Felder